Bernartice is a municipality and village in Trutnov District in the Hradec Králové Region of the Czech Republic. It has about 900 inhabitants.

Administrative parts
The village of Křenov is an administrative part of Bernartice.

Geography
It lies in the Broumov Highlands. The Ličná Stream flows through the municipality.

History
The first written mention of Bernartice is from 1297. It was founded during the colonization during the reign of King Ottokar II of Bohemia, probably around 1260.

During the World War II, the German occupiers operated a subcamp of the Gross-Rosen concentration camp in the village in which over 400 Jewish women deported from various countries were subjected to forced labour. The camp was liberated in May 1945.

Sights
The Church of the Assumption of the Virgin Mary is the landmark of the municipality. This Baroque church was built in 1677–1678.

References

External links

Villages in Trutnov District